Dr Pinchas Toledano (פנחס טולידאנו)  is Hakham-Emeritus (Chief Rabbi) of Amsterdam and of the Spanish and Portuguese Jews of the Netherlands. 
He was also the official Av Beit Din, head of the court, of the Netherlands Beit Din.

Biography 
He studied under his father, Baruch Avraham Toledano, and also attended various yeshivot in England and Israel, receiving semikha - ordination - at age 20. He is also  a certified shochet (ritual slaughterer), sofer (scribe) and mohel.

In 1969 he received a BA Hons in Semitics from the University of London. 
In 1980 he received his PhD from London, his dissertation focusing on the relationship between Rashi and the Targumim.

In 1974 he was appointed Dayan (rabbinic judge) of the Sephardi Community of London and in 1980 was Av Bet Din. In 1998, he was appointed Dayan of the Dutch Sephardi Beth Din. He was appointed as Hakham of the Spanish and Portuguese community of the Netherlands in 2012. Since 2020 he is Hakham-Emeritus.

Works 
Dayan Toledano is author of several scholarly works, including Berit Shalom, which collects his Rabbinical Responsa in 3 volumes, and Mekor Beracha, also 3 volumes, a code of Jewish Law with notes, commentary, and sources as based on contemporary poskim.
His English output includes Fountain of blessings, a translation of the latter, and The Bene Israel of India.

See also 
 Spanish and Portuguese Jews
 Chief Rabbis of Amsterdam

References

External links 
 Portuguese Esnoga Amsterdam

Living people
Chief rabbis of the Netherlands
Dutch Sephardi Jews
Spanish and Portuguese Jews
Sephardi rabbis
Year of birth missing (living people)